Oostwold Airport, also known as Groningen Airport Oostwold, is a small general aviation airport in Oostwold, a village in municipality of Oldambt in the province of Groningen in the Netherlands. The ICAO code EHOW has been assigned to the airfield.

It has one runway, 07/25, with a length of 880 meters (2,887) feet. It has a grass surface, with a narrow concrete strip available for the first 600 meters (1,968 feet) in the 25 direction. Except for flights from Schengen countries, no international flights are allowed.

References

External links
 
 Oostwold Airport, official website
 Photos taken at Oostwold (EHOW) from Airliners.net

Airports in Groningen (province)
Transport in Oldambt (municipality)